Rodney McGee (born 11 March 1974 in Blacktown) is an Australian former track cyclist. He won the team pursuit at the 1995 UCI Track Cycling World Championships with his brother Bradley McGee and Tim O'Shannessey and Stuart O'Grady.

External links

1974 births
Living people
Australian male cyclists
People from Blacktown, New South Wales
UCI Track Cycling World Champions (men)
Australian track cyclists